Ofotens Tidende is an online newspaper published in Narvik, Norway. From 1899 to 2000, Ofotens Tidende was a Conservative newspaper owned by Harstad Tidende. In the last year of publication, it had a circulation of 3,606, compared to the competitor Fremover's 10,114. It reappeared as a pure online newspaper in 2007.

External links
Official site

1899 establishments in Norway
2007 establishments in Norway
Conservative Party (Norway) newspapers
Mass media in Nordland
Norwegian news websites
Online newspapers with defunct print editions
Newspapers established in 1899
Publications disestablished in 2000
Publications established in 2007
Defunct newspapers published in Norway
Norwegian-language newspapers